A Shabbat elevator is an elevator which works in a special mode, operating automatically, to satisfy the Jewish law requiring Jews to abstain from operating electrical switches on Shabbat (the Sabbath). These are also known as Sabbath or Shabbos elevators.

Description and history
Jewish law forbids those who observe it from undertaking various forms of "work" on the Sabbath, including that they may not create sparks or fires. In recent times, this has been extrapolated to also cover the operation of electrical equipment.

An elevator may be marked with a sign noting that it is specially configured for Shabbat observance. There are several ways the elevator works (going up and down), stopping at every floor, stopping at alternate floors, or rising to the top floor and stopping, while going down.

Shabbat elevators can be found in areas of large Jewish population in Israel, the United States, Canada, Australia, Ukraine (Dnipro), Argentina, and Brazil. They are found in hotels, hospitals and other health institutions, apartment buildings, and sometimes in synagogues.

The Israeli Knesset passed a special Shabbat elevator law in 2001, ordering the planning and building of all residential buildings, and public buildings which have more than one elevator, to install a control mechanism for Shabbat (Shabbat module) in one of the elevators.

In this mode, an elevator will stop automatically at every floor, allowing people to step in and out without having to press any buttons. Otherwise, Jewish law prohibits observers from using an elevator on Shabbat in the usual manner, because pressing the button to operate the elevator closes a circuit, which is one of the activities prohibited on Shabbat and may also indirectly lead to "writing" of the new floor number in the display. 

In 2009, some Haredi rabbis, led by Rabbi Yosef Shalom Elyashiv, published a religious injunction forbidding the use of Shabbat elevators.

Some interpreters believe that a non-Jew known as a "Shabbos goy" may not be employed to press the buttons and hold the door for Jews in buildings that do not have Shabbat elevators, unless the Jew has great difficulty using the stairs themselves. As discussed in that article, a non-Jew is not expected to keep the Sabbath like a Jew. Therefore, Jewish law holds that a Jew may benefit from work performed by a non-Jew only if the non-Jew performs this work for his own good and of his own free will.

A borderline case is when a Jew hints to a non-Jew that he wants him to perform a certain service without explicitly asking him. These borderline cases are not considered legitimate by many Orthodox rabbis.

Criticism
There are three categories of criticism against using a Shabbat elevator:

Elevators may be prohibited anyway
Some halakhic authorities rule that this classic Shabbat elevator does not fully overcome the relevant halakhic issues. Among other things, a person's weight on a downward-traveling elevator can be considered to partly cause the elevator's descent, and, therefore, the activation of all electric circuits which come into play as a result of it. Thus, when a person ascends in an elevator, the motor that moves the counterweight down and the elevator car up is operating to counteract the rider's weight, which is a hindrance to make operation of the elevator require more work-energy. However, when a person descends an elevator, the person's weight helps move the elevator in the downward direction, so the person is considered physically to cause the elevator to move down. Accordingly, some authorities permit ascending in an elevator, but prohibit descending.

The movement of an elevator may also indirectly cause other events to take place that are forbidden under Jewish law. For example, in many systems, one light turns off, and another light turns on, as the elevator passes from one floor to the next. Some commentators find that turning on incandescent floor lights violates a Biblical prohibition against kindling a fire on the Sabbath. The Zomet Institute and the Institute for Science and Halacha modify elevators to avoid these issues.

Permitted, but discouraged
An elevator in a Shabbat mode is an example of a legal workaround, where seemingly "forbidden" acts can be performed by modifying the relevant technology to such an extent that no law is actually violated. Usage of a Shabbat elevator by those who are otherwise capable is considered by some rabbinical authorities as a "violation" of Shabbat; therefore, many Orthodox Jews might prefer to walk up or down the stairs instead of taking an elevator.

Energy waste from continuous operation
In comparison to a normal elevator, which remains stationary until needed, Shabbat mode has the side effect of using more energy running the elevator car sequentially up and down every floor of a building, repeatedly servicing floors where it is not needed. For a tall building with many floors, the car must move on a frequent enough basis so as to not cause undue delay for potential users who will not touch the controls as it opens the doors on every floor up the building.

See also
 39 categories of activity prohibited on Shabbat
 Electricity on Shabbat
 Driving on Shabbat
 Paternoster elevator

Bibliography
 Bannett, D. R. The Sabbath Elevator Question, Elevators and Shabbat, The Institute for Science and Halacha.

References

External links

Shabbat innovations
Elevators